Summerford is an unincorporated community in Somerford Township, Madison County, Ohio, United States.

History

Summerford was laid out by Joseph Christian in 1833–4, and was originally known as Somerford.  The Summerford Post Office was established on June 6, 1837.  As of 1875, the community contained two churches, a drug store, two grocery stores, one hotel, and two blacksmith shops, and the population was about 20.  The post office was discontinued on December 15, 1905.  The mail service is now sent through the London branch.

The name of the community was changed to Summerford by the Board on Geographic Names in 1961.

References

Unincorporated communities in Madison County, Ohio
Unincorporated communities in Ohio